Atemelia torquatella is a species of moth belonging to the family Plutellidae first described by Friederike Lienig and Philipp Christoph Zeller in 1846.

It is native to Europe.

References

Plutellidae